Ghazaleh Chalabi (Persian: غزاله چلابی; born 1989 – September 21, 2022) was an Iranian mountaineer and athlete who was shot in the head and killed by the government of Iran during the Mahsa Amini protests in Amol.

Background 
Ghazaleh Chalabi was born in 1989 in Amol. She studied banking management and was an accountant for a private company.

Death 
While Ghazaleh was filming the Iranian people protest against the government of Iran on September 21, 2022, she was shot in the head and killed by a direct sniper rifle shot by an officer of the Islamic Revolutionary Guard. While Ghazaleh was filming, She had recorded the moment she was hit by the sniper bullet. This video was widely spreaded on the Internet, social media, and news agencies.

Preventing from donating her organs 
‌Before her death, Ghazaleh had filled out the organ donation application twice and wanted her organs to be donated in case of brain death. Chalabi's family announced that they will donate her body parts, but the government of Iran did not allow her family to do so, and according to Ghazaleh's aunt, the security officers said, "This will make Ghazaleh a legend."

See also 
 Death of Hadis Najafi
 Death of Mahsa Amini

References

Mahsa Amini protests
2022 deaths
Political repression in Iran
History of the Islamic Republic of Iran
September 2022 events in Iran
Women's rights in Iran
Women deaths
Hijab
People killed in the Mahsa Amini protests
Violence against women in Iran